The Dixie Walesbilt Hotel (also known as the  Hotel Walesbilt) is a historic hotel in Lake Wales, Florida, United States located at 5 Park Avenue West and/or 115 North 1st Street. The Walesbilt Hotel was renamed the Hotel Grand by the New York owner Victor Khubani during the 1980s. The structure was built in 1926 after a stock-sale campaign in the local business community. It opened on January 14, 1927, two years before Edward Bok's famous Bok Tower was completed nearby.  Original owners included then Governor Martin of Florida and silent screen star Thomas Meighan along with a consortium of other actors/actresses including Mary Pickford, Gloria Swanson and Clara Bow as well as famous Hollywood attorney Nathan Burkan and Hollywood Producer Victor Heerman.

The interior of the building was even more ornate than the exterior. It featured shopping arcades, Italian-made ceilings and column capitals, a drinking fountain by Ernest A. Batchelder, Georgia Pink and Vermont Verde antique marble floors by Georgia Marble Company, a wrought iron balustrade, and a central mezzanine. Construction is of steel-reinforced poured concrete in post-and-beam method, without bearing walls. The building suffered only superficial damage during the hurricanes of 2004.

On August 31, 1990, the hotel was added to the U.S. National Register of Historic Places.

In 1995 it was sold at auction and closed. The interior was partially dismantled for reconstruction, which was never completed. In February 2010, a redevelopment agreement was proposed between the City of Lake Wales and a private sector developer led by Ray Brown to return the hotel to its original finishes and repurpose the building as 19,500 square foot Boutique Hotel with commercial space.

References

External links
 Polk County listings, Florida's Office of Cultural and Historical Programs
 , Modern Cities
  City of Lake Wales
  Abandoned Florida

Hotel buildings completed in 1926
Buildings and structures in Lake Wales, Florida
National Register of Historic Places in Polk County, Florida
Defunct hotels in Florida
Vernacular architecture in Florida
1926 establishments in Florida
Hotel buildings on the National Register of Historic Places in Florida
Hotels in Florida